Zubeidaa is a 2001 Indian film directed by Shyam Benegal and written by Khalid Mohammed. It stars Karisma Kapoor, Rekha, Manoj Bajpayee, Surekha Sikri, Rajit Kapoor, Lillete Dubey, Amrish Puri, Farida Jalal, and Shakti Kapoor. A.R. Rahman has scored the background music and soundtrack for the movie.

Zubeidaa is the concluding chapter in a trilogy that began with Mammo (1994) and continued with Sardari Begum (1996). The film is based on the life of the ill-fated actress Zubeida Begum, who married Hanwant Singh of Jodhpur and was the mother of the film's writer, Khalid Mohamed.

The film garnered the National Film Award for Best Feature Film in Hindi and won Karisma Kapoor a Filmfare Award for Best Actress (Critics). It is regarded by many critics as Kapoor's best performance (alongside Fiza where she also played the title role). The film was highly acclaimed and is regarded as of one of Benegal's best works blurring the lines of commercial and parallel cinema.

Plot 

Zubeidaa is the story of Riyaz's (Rajit Kapoor) search to understand his mother, who is not known to him, as he was brought up by his maternal grandmother in the absence of his mother. His mother's name was Zubeidaa (Karisma Kapoor) and she was the only daughter of a filmmaker named Suleman Seth (Amrish Puri). Zubeidaa acts in films secretly, but when her father finds out he forbids her to carry on and quickly arranges her marriage to his friend's son Dr. Mehboob Alam who becomes a Gharjamai. Things seem happy for her when she gives birth to Riyaz. However, a disagreement arises between Suleman and Mehboob's father, and Mehboob divorces Zubeidaa a few days after she gives birth.

Heartbroken Zubeidaa then meets Maharaja Vijayendra Singh of Fatehpur (Manoj Bajpayee). Vijayendra is already married to Maharani Mandira Devi (Rekha) and is the father of two children. Nevertheless, he falls in love with Zubeidaa and they get married, but there is continuous turmoil in their relationship. Riyaz learns through Zubeidaa's journal that though she loved Vijayendra dearly, she was unable to follow the stifling customs of the palace. She was also uncomfortable because of her brother-in-law Uday Singh's sexual advances towards her, and his demands of her to have an extra-marital affair with him.

Riyaz travels to Fatehpur and asks many people about his mother. However, all except Mandira, whom Zubeidaa called "Mandy Didi", either deny that his mother ever existed, or say that she was a horrible woman who seduced their king and caused his death in a plane crash.

On reading the journal, Riyaz finds out that Vijayendra had become a politician, and was about to go to Delhi for an important meeting. Zubeidaa felt frustrated that whenever her husband needed help he looked to Mandira for support, and at the last minute, she insisted that only she will accompany him to the meeting. The plane crashes, killing Zubeidaa and Vijayendra. It is indicated that Uday Singh probably had the plane sabotaged to kill Vijayendra and Mandira so that he could get both - Zubeidaa and the kingdom.

In the end, Riyaz gets the missing tape of his mother's only film, from Mandira. The movie ends with him finally getting to watch the film with his grandmother shedding tears of happiness, watching Zubeidaa dancing happily as the spirited soul that she truly was.

Cast 

 Karisma Kapoor ... Zubeidaa Suleiman Seth/Zubeidaa Mehboob Alam/Rani Meenakshi Devi  
 Rekha ... Maharani Mandira Devi (Mandy) 
 Manoj Bajpayee ... Maharaja Vijayendra Singh (Victor) 
 Rahul Singh ... Raja Digvijay "Uday" Singh
 Rajit Kapur ... Riyaz Masud
 Surekha Sikri ... Fayyazi
 Amrish Puri ... Suleiman Seth
 Seema Pahwa ... Zainab Bi
 Farida Jalal ... Mammo
 Shakti Kapoor ... Dance Master Hiralal
 Lillete Dubey ... Rose Davenport
 Ravi Jhankal ... Girivar Singh
 Smriti Mishra ... Sardari Begum
 S M Zaheer ... Sajid Masud
 Harish Patel ... Nandlal Seth

Soundtrack 

The soundtrack was released in 2000 and contained eight tracks, all composed by A. R. Rahman, with lyrics by Javed Akhtar. Lata Mangeshkar collaborated with the musician again for a couple of tracks. Other singers, Kavita Krishnamurthy and Alka Yagnik walked away with all accolades for their renditions in their respective tracks.

Reception
Suman Tarafdar of Filmfare described the film as "very much a classy Benegal film, with new explorations of the human relationships in their multi-layered frameworks." and Kapoor "for having come up with such an assured performance".

Awards 
 National Film Award for Best Feature Film in Hindi
 Filmfare Critics Award for Best Actress – Karisma Kapoor

References

External links 

2001 films
2000s Hindi-language films
Films directed by Shyam Benegal
Films about actors
Films about women in India
Films about royalty
Films set in Rajasthan
Films scored by A. R. Rahman
Best Hindi Feature Film National Film Award winners
Films distributed by Yash Raj Films
Films about Bollywood